Jackson Chukwudi Dandy commonly known as Dandy Jackson Chukwudi is a Nigerian author of novels, short stories and editor. He is the co-founder of the now defunct InstaNovella. ThisDay described him as an author "who blends modernity to his fantasy stories and giving [us] a taste of what we know and understand."

Life and career
Dandy is a Nigerian from Abia State. In 2020, he co-founded InstaNovella with Awaji-Itimikpang Abadi. He has published two novels.
He is considered to be among the third generation of Nigerian writers.

Bibliography
Novels

References

External links 

Nigerian writers
Living people
Nigerian fantasy writers
21st-century Nigerian writers
Year of birth missing (living people)